Songversation is the fifth studio album by American singer India.Arie. The album was released on June 25, 2013, by Soulbird Music and Motown Records. It includes the singles "6th Avenue" (released in 2012), "Cocoa Butter" and "Just Do You" (both released in 2013). It also includes "I Am Light" which was featured in the 2014 film Beyond the Lights. A music video for the album track "Break the Shell" was released as well.

Critical reception

Review aggregator Metacritic, which assigns a normalised rating out of 100 to reviews from mainstream critics, the album has a weighted average score of 64 based on four reviews, indicating "generally favorable reviews".

Commercial performance
The album debuted at number seven on the Billboard 200 chart, with first-week sales of 31,000 copies in the United States.  The album has sold 113,000 copies in the US as of September 2015.

Track listing

Charts

Weekly charts

Year-end charts

References

2013 albums
India Arie albums